Michael-Bruno, LLC is an American architectural design, engineering service and
construction management firm. The company is headquartered in Wilmington, Delaware, with operations in Europe, Africa, and the Middle East. Founded in 2003, they run multiple overseas operations. Michael-Bruno, LLC has won multiple contracts with NATO and the U.S. military, including the Navy.

Clients have included the U.S. Army Corps of Engineers (USACE), the Command Joint Task Force-Horn of Africa (CJTF-HOA); Joint Force Command (NATO) Southern Europe; Department of State (DoS); Defense Information Systems Agency (DISA); Department of Defense Dependents Schools (DoDDS); Defense Communications & Army Transmission Systems (DCATS); Naval Facilities Engineering Command (NAVFAC); Space and Naval Warfare Systems Command (SPAWAR); U.S. Air Force, and United States Agency for International Development (USAID).

CEO Background
Michael Sedge left Flint, Michigan in 1973 to serve in the United States Navy, where he was assigned to diverse locales in Europe until 1977. In 1989 Sedge developed MCI's global military marketing calling card activities, where he worked with a sales network of 47 people until 1995. His last four years on the project, the company's military market revenues increased by $3 million annually. After 1995, Arrowhead Global Solutions assigned Sedge to manage the logistical, operational, and financial activities of the Army Air Force Exchange Service (AAFES) contract for AT&T Call Home during the war in Bosnia.

Following this, he was assigned as in-country project manager for Arrowhead Global Solutions’ contract with Defense Information Systems Agency (DISA) for the design and construction of satellite communications systems in Italy.

Sedge, an author of 10 books and three television documentaries, has also worked as a foreign correspondent on military matters for The Associated Press. He was focused in the Mediterranean region, Middle East and Northern Africa. In 2003 Sedge was a contributing editor to the "Armed Forces Journal International," publishing such features as Not-So-Friendly Fire War in Iraq Shows Fratricide Remains an Enduring Problem in the "Armed Forces Journal International". It was a report on casualties of friendly fire during the U.S. led war in Iraq, including causes of friendly fire incidents and technical solutions to the problem. He authored Double Your Income Through Foreign Sales and Commercialization of the Oceans. His non-fiction work The Lost Ships of Pisa won the President of the Italian Republic's Book of the Year Award for a Foreign Author.

VP Background
Vice President Bruno Giuseppe obtained a degree in Engineering from the University of Naples, where he specialized in electrical engineering. In 1987 he joined his father's construction company, and for ten years often worked under contract with the U.S. Navy and NATO, providing architectural design, engineering, and construction. In 1993 he expanded his family business by winning a bid for the U.S. Navy's "Family House Maintenance", a contract he kept for 11 more years.

Bruno eventually took over the family's firm. In the last 1990s he downsized the construction aspects of the business. He instead competed by focusing on architectural design and engineering services and, opened Studio Tecnico di Giuseppe Bruno. The company was unique in its ability to develop designs in accordance with U.S. and/or European architectural, mechanical and electrical practices while adapting local construction methods.

Since then, Bruno has been involved in Italian government renovation projects, which include The Vittorio Emanuele Monument in Rome, the Teatro Metastasio in Prato, and the Palazzo dei Priori in Peruga. He also authored the Manual for Safety in the Workplace, which is used in engineering classes in Italian universities.

Founding of Company
In 2003 Sedge hired Giuseppe Bruno's engineering firm for the DISA Teleport program, under Arrowhead Global Solutions, and after the two became acquainted on the project decided to go into business together. They each fronted $2500 and three months later Michael-Bruno, LLC had private and governmental commissions across the United States, Europe, and the Pacific.

Sedge serves as CEO, while Bruno is project manager and Executive Vice President. They are certified to provide services for architecture, landscaping, engineering, drafting, geophysical surveying and mapping, laboratory testing, interior and industrial design, and graphic design. Like Bruno's original firm, their designs fit U.S. and/or European codes while adapting local construction codes, materials, and methods.

On December 7, 2004 Michael-Bruno, LLC was certified as a "Top 20% Performer (with 95% customer satisfaction) by the Past Performance Evaluation survey.

Headquarters
The company is headquartered in Wilmington, Delaware, though they operate seven offices, including a field office in Naples, Italy. In 2009 the company began to operate a field office in Djibouti on the horn of Africa in order to win civil engineering and design contracts from the American Navy. They also operate an office in Bahrain.

Profit Margin
Their first year the company earned revenues of more than $600,000. In 2007, that had jumped to $1.6 million. Since their first commission in 2005 and ending in 2009, the company has been awarded $940,968 in defense contracts to the U.S. Department of Defense (specifically to the Navy). They are classified as a U.S. small business.

Projects
The company has done work in Italy, Germany, Djibouti, Ethiopia, Greece, Kenya, Ghana, and the United States. Michael-Bruno, LLC has also been commissioned by NATO and the U.S. government in Africa, Europe, and the Middle East.

Government
Seaport-Enhanced (Seaport-e) is a $5.3 billion multiple-award umbrella contract that lets the US Navy and Marine Corps procure support services. In July 2010 the US Navy awarded contracts to 556 contractors, including Michael-Bruno, LLC. The contracts have a four-year base period.

In 2005 and 2006 they worked on constructions in Italy for Naval Facilities Engineering Command. In 2008 to 2009 they continued to provide architect/engineering services, engineering management, and production engineering for the US Navy in Italy as well as Africa. Under SeaPort-e, the U.S. Navy awarded the company contracts in Bahrain and Djibouti in September 2010.

The firm also won a $2.5 million A/E contract with the U.S. Army Corps of Engineers –Europe, in July 2010.

While pursuing government contracts they have been in teaming partnerships with companies such as AMEC, Arrowhead Global Solutions (USA), IAP, Lockheed Martin, PAE, SKE International, and Tetra Tech. In 2009 they exhibited at the Joint Engineer Training Conference & Expo, held by The Society of American Military Engineers.

Public Sector
Recent design and construction management projects include multiplex cinemas in Europe, totaling over $30,000,000, as well as a multimillion-dollar development project for the Southern Italian City of Pomigliano d’Arco. Other recent works have been carried out for McDonald’s Italia and CREDEM Bank Italia.

Michael-Bruno, LLC has been the design partner of Naples-based contracting company
LA TERMICA S.r.l., as well as multi-national firms such as AMEC, HDR, PAE, SKE
International, and Tetra Tech.

LIGHT by MB
Bruno is established in Europe for his electrical engineering and runs a small division of fiber optic specialists in the company. They have created several light designs, including one for the famous Vittorio Emanuele II Monument in Rome. He was also commissioned by The Italian Superintendent of Architectural Heritage to do fiber optic work in the 13th century Cloisters of Santa Chiara. Using fiber optics and other strategies, their lighting techniques work on churches, monuments, gardens, arenas, shopping malls, etc.

References

External links 

Engineering companies of the United States
Private military contractors
Companies established in 2003